Show Boat is a 1929 American romantic drama film based on the 1926 novel Show Boat by Edna Ferber. The film initially did not use the 1927 stage musical of the same name as a source, but scenes were later added into the film incorporating two of the songs from the musical as well as other songs. This version was released by Universal in two editions, one a silent film for movie theatres still not equipped for sound, and one a part-talkie with a sound prologue.

The film was long believed to be lost, but most of it has been found and released on LaserDisc and shown on Turner Classic Movies. A number of sections of the soundtrack were found in the mid-1990s on Vitaphone records, although the film was made with a Movietone soundtrack. Two more records were discovered in 2005.

Plot 
The eighteen-year-old Magnolia meets, falls in love with, and elopes with riverboat gambler Gaylord Ravenal.

After her father Captain Andy dies, Magnolia, Ravenal, and their daughter Kim leave the boat and go to live in Chicago, where they live off Ravenal's gambling earnings and are alternately rich and poor. Finally, Parthy announces she is coming to visit at a time when Ravenal is completely broke, and, fearing her wrath, he abandons Magnolia and Kim, after which Magnolia finds a job singing at a local club and eventually becomes famous. Years later, Parthy dies, and Magnolia, who had long been estranged from her because of her attitude toward Ravenal, returns to the show boat. Magnolia and Ravenal are reunited on the show boat at the end of the film, and after Parthy's death, Magnolia gives her own inheritance money to her daughter Kim.

Cast and crew 

The film stars:
 Laura La Plante as Magnolia Hawks
 Joseph Schildkraut as Gaylord Ravenal
 Emily Fitzroy as Parthenia 'Parthy' Ann Hawks
 Otis Harlan as Capt'n Andy Hawks and the Master of Ceremonies in Prologue
 Alma Rubens as Julie Dozier
 Jack McDonald as Windy
 Jane La Verne as Magnolia as a Child/Kim
 Neely Edwards as Schultzy
 Elise Bartlett as Elly
 Stepin Fetchit as Joe
 Gertrude Howard as Queenie

Sound adaptation 
These were the years in which film studios were making a transition from silent films to sound films and this version of Show Boat was made as a silent film. The studio panicked when they realized that audiences might be expecting a sound version of Show Boat because sound films had become so popular, and the film was temporarily withheld from release.

Subsequently, several scenes were then reshot to include about 30 minutes of dialogue and singing. At first, the songs recorded for the film had nothing to do with the Broadway score. However, Universal began to fear that audiences might instead be expecting, rather than just the Ferber novel, a film version of the stage musical, which had become a smash hit and was still playing on Broadway at the same time that the 1929 film premiered. So, a two-reel sound prologue, featuring original Broadway cast members Helen Morgan (Julie), Jules Bledsoe (Joe), Tess Gardella (Queenie) and the Jubilee Singers singing five songs from the show, was added, and the movie was released both as a part-talkie and as a silent film without the prologue.

Otis Harlan, who played Cap'n Andy in the film, served as Master of Ceremonies in the prologue, which featured legendary impresario Florenz Ziegfeld, producer of the stage musical version of Show Boat, and Carl Laemmle, the producer of the film, as themselves.  In the actual storyline of the film, Laura la Plante, with a dubbed singing voice, performs five songs, two of them from the stage musical -  "Ol' Man River" (which Magnolia does not sing at all in any other version of Show Boat), and "Can't Help Lovin' Dat Man". Both of these songs were sung in circumstances entirely different from any version of the musical. The other songs that Ms. La Plante sang in the film were traditional spirituals such as "I Got Shoes" and (it is believed) "Deep River",  as well as a coon song of the early 1900s entitled "Coon, Coon, Coon". Her singing voice was dubbed by soprano Eva Olivetti.

It was long believed that an entirely new score was written by Billy Rose for the film, but according to Miles Kreuger in his book Show Boat: The Story of a Classic American Musical, this turns out to not be true. Rose wrote only one new song for the film, and the Broadway score was not dropped because of any suggestion by him, as is often claimed.

The singing voice of Stepin Fetchit, who played Joe in the film, was provided by Jules Bledsoe, the original Joe of the 1927 stage production of the musical. Fetchit mouthed the lyrics to a popular song of the time entitled "The Lonesome Road", which, as sung on the soundtrack by Bledsoe, served as the film's finale instead of a final reprise of Ol' Man River, as in the show.

The entire stage score, except for "Can't Help Lovin' Dat Man", "Bill", "Ol' Man River", and the little-known songs "C'mon Folks! (Queenie's Ballyhoo)" and "Hey Feller!", was replaced in the 1929 film by several spirituals and popular songs written by other songwriters, and largely because of this, the movie was not a success. Most of the songs taken from the stage version were heard only in the prologue and in the film's exit music, not the film itself. It is likely though that the fact that it was a part-talkie may have played a part in its failure. The then-recent 1929 film version of The Desert Song, an all-sound film almost literally faithful to the stage musical of the same name, had been a huge success, and audiences were no longer willing to accept part-talking musical films.

Several of the extant parts of the 1929 Show Boat have been combined and occasionally shown on Turner Classic Movies. Fragments of the prologue not included in the TCM showings, both sound and picture, were shown as part of A&E's biography of Florenz Ziegfeld, and have turned up on YouTube. However, in the TCM version, the visual print of the prologue sequence has been replaced with an "Overture" card.

References

External links 

 
 
 
 

1929 films
1929 romantic drama films
American musical drama films
American romantic drama films
American silent feature films
American black-and-white films
Films based on American novels
Films directed by Harry A. Pollard
Transitional sound films
Universal Pictures films
Films based on works by Edna Ferber
1920s rediscovered films
Rediscovered American films
1920s English-language films
1920s American films
Silent romantic drama films
Silent American drama films